Harminder Dulowal (born 7 November 1986) is an International Bodybuilder from Kapurthala Punjab.

About
He is an athletic Coach and  the president of a prestigious federation of bodybuilding, the Fitness International Federation (FIF).

Awards
 Mr. Asia Gold Medalist
 FIF International Judge Award 
 Asia bronze Medalist
 All India intervarsity silver medalist
 Mr World South Africa 2015
 Mr. Asia 4th in Singapore 2016

References

Athletes from Rajasthan
Living people
1986 births
People from Kapurthala